A pyramid (from  ) is a structure whose outer surfaces are triangular and converge to a single step at the top, making the shape roughly a pyramid in the geometric sense. The base of a pyramid can be trilateral, quadrilateral, or of any polygon shape. As such, a pyramid has at least three outer triangular surfaces (at least four faces including the base). The square pyramid, with a square base and four triangular outer surfaces, is a common version.

A pyramid's design, with the majority of the weight closer to the ground and with the pyramidion at the apex, means that less material higher up on the pyramid will be pushing down from above. This distribution of weight allowed early civilizations to create stable monumental structures.

Civilizations in many parts of the world have built pyramids. The largest pyramid by volume is the Mesoamerican Great Pyramid of Cholula, in the Mexican state of Puebla. For thousands of years, the largest structures on Earth were pyramids—first the Red Pyramid in the Dashur Necropolis and then the Great Pyramid of Khufu, both in Egypt—the latter is the only one of the Seven Wonders of the Ancient World still remaining.

Ancient monuments

West Asia

Mesopotamia 

The Mesopotamians built the earliest pyramidal structures, called ziggurats. In ancient times, these were brightly painted in gold/bronze. Since they were constructed of sun-dried mud-brick, little remains of them.  Ziggurats were built by the Sumerians, Babylonians, Elamites, Akkadians, and Assyrians for local religions. Each ziggurat was part of a temple complex which included other buildings. The precursors of the ziggurat were raised platforms that date from the Ubaid period during the fourth millennium BC. The earliest ziggurats began near the end of the Early Dynastic Period. The latest Mesopotamian ziggurats date from the 6th century BC.

Built in receding tiers upon a rectangular, oval, or square platform, the ziggurat was a pyramidal structure with a flat top. Sun-baked bricks made up the core of the ziggurat with facings of fired bricks on the outside. The facings were often glazed in different colors and may have had astrological significance. Kings sometimes had their names engraved on these glazed bricks. The number of tiers ranged from two to seven. It is assumed that they had shrines at the top, but there is no archaeological evidence for this and the only textual evidence is from Herodotus. Access to the shrine would have been by a series of ramps on one side of the ziggurat or by a spiral ramp from base to summit.

Africa

Egypt 

The most famous pyramids are the Egyptian ones — huge structures built of bricks or stones, some of which are among the world's largest constructions. They are shaped as a reference to the rays of the sun. Most pyramids had a smoothed white limestone surface. Many of the facing stones have fallen or have been removed and used for construction in Cairo. The capstone was usually made of limestone, granite or basalt and some of them were plated with electrum. 

The ancient Egyptians built pyramids from 2700 BC until around 1700 BC. The first pyramid was erected during the Third Dynasty by the Pharaoh Djoser and his architect Imhotep. This step pyramid consisted of six stacked mastabas. Early kings such as Snefru built several pyramids, with subsequent kings adding to the number of pyramids until the end of the Middle Kingdom. The age of the pyramids reached its zenith at Giza in 2575–2150 BC. The last king to build royal pyramids was Ahmose, with later kings hiding their tombs in the hills, such as those in the Valley of the Kings in Luxor's West Bank. In Medinat Habu and Deir el-Medina, smaller pyramids were built by individuals. Smaller pyramids with steeper sides were also built by the Nubians who ruled Egypt in the Late Period.

The Great Pyramid of Giza is the largest in Egypt and one of the largest in the world. At  it was the tallest structure in the world until the Lincoln Cathedral was finished in 1311 AD. The Great Pyramid is the only of the Seven Wonders of the Ancient World to survive into modern times.

Ancient Egyptian pyramids were, in most cases, placed west of the river Nile because the divine pharaoh's soul was meant to join with the sun during its descent before continuing with the sun in its eternal round. As of 2008, some 135 pyramids have been discovered in Egypt, most located near modern day Cairo.

Sudan 

While pyramids are associated with Egypt, the nation of Sudan has 220 extant pyramids, the most numerous in the world.
Nubian pyramids were constructed (roughly 240 of them) at three sites in Sudan to serve as tombs for the kings and queens of Napata and Meroë. The pyramids of Kush, also known as Nubian Pyramids, have different characteristics than the pyramids of Egypt. The Nubian pyramids were constructed at a steeper angle than the Egyptian ones. Pyramids were still being built in Sudan as late as 200 AD.

Sahel 

The pyramidal Tomb of the Askia Muhammad I emperor of Songhai in Gao is the perfect example of the monumental mud constructions of the Sahel, it is the central element of the architectural complex extending over 4.24 ha (456,000 sq ft) which constitutes the Mausoleum of the Emperor with two mosque and a Cemetery, the pyramid measures  in height with two levels upstairs. It is built of Mud and riddled with numerous wooden pikes. The architecture of the pyramid is close to the Meidum pyramid of the pharaoh Sneferu of Egypt. The pyramid-mausoleum is built by Emperor Askiya the great (1493-1528) of the Songhai Empire in the 15th century after his pilgrimage to Mecca, it serves more as a Minaret for the two mosques and the pious Muslim emperor is modestly buried in the unbuilt cemetery of the mausoleum, the intrepid conqueror Askia Muhammad I, genius administrator and man of culture is among the greatest emperors of the Songhai Empire one of the largest contiguous land empire in history and the largest and powerful in African history , it extended over the Sahel, West Africa, the Maghreb and Central Africa in the 15th and 16th centuries. The Songhai are a population belonging to the same Ethnolinguistic Nilo-Saharan group as the Nubian builders of the pyramids of Nubia, both populations are close to the ancient Egyptians. The other pyramidal constructions of the songhai country are the minaret of the Djinguereber Mosque of Timbuktu, the minaret of the Sankore university of Timbuktu and the three tower-minarets of the Mosque of Djenne. The pyramid is listed as a World Heritage Site by UNESCO. It was the target of jihadist attacks during the Mali War, but the Songhai population of Gao sees to its maintenance each year and these two mosques are still in service. It is the last Tomb - pyramid built by an African Sovereign.

Nigeria 
One of the unique structures of Igbo culture was the Nsude Pyramids, at the Nigerian town of Nsude, northern Igboland. Ten pyramidal structures were built of clay/mud. Circular stacks continued, till it reached the top. The structures were temples for the god Ala, who was believed to reside at the top. A stick was placed at the top to represent the god's residence. The structures were laid in groups of five parallel to each other. Because it was built of clay/mud like the Deffufa of Nubia, time has taken its toll requiring periodic reconstruction.

Europe

Greece 

Pausanias (2nd century AD) mentions two buildings resembling pyramids, one, 19 kilometres (12 mi) southwest of the still standing structure at Hellenikon, a common tomb for soldiers who died in a legendary struggle for the throne of Argos and another which he was told was the tomb of Argives killed in a battle around 669/8 BC. Neither of these still survive and there is no evidence that they resembled Egyptian pyramids.

There are also at least two surviving pyramid-like structures still available to study, one at Hellenikon and the other at Ligourio/Ligurio, a village near the ancient theatre Epidaurus. These buildings were not constructed in the same manner as the pyramids in Egypt. They do have inwardly sloping walls but other than those there is no obvious resemblance to Egyptian pyramids. They had large central rooms (unlike Egyptian pyramids) and the Hellenikon structure is rectangular rather than square,  which means that the sides could not have met at a point. The stone used to build these structures was limestone quarried locally and was cut to fit, not into freestanding blocks like the Great Pyramid of Giza.

The dating of these structures has been made from the pot shards excavated from the floor and on the grounds. The latest dates available from scientific dating have been estimated around the 5th and 4th centuries. Normally this technique is used for dating pottery, but here researchers have used it to try to date stone flakes from the walls of the structures. This has created some debate about whether or not these structures are actually older than Egypt, which is part of the Black Athena controversy.

Mary Lefkowitz has criticised this research. She suggests that some of the research was done not to determine the reliability of the dating method, as was suggested, but to back up an assumption of age and to make certain points about pyramids and Greek civilization. She notes that not only are the results not very precise, but that other structures mentioned in the research are not in fact pyramids, e.g. a tomb alleged to be the tomb of Amphion and Zethus near Thebes, a structure at Stylidha (Thessaly) which is just a long wall, etc. She also notes the possibility that the stones that were dated might have been recycled from earlier constructions. She also notes that earlier research from the 1930s, confirmed in the 1980s by Fracchia was ignored. She argues that they undertook their research using a novel and previously untested methodology in order to confirm a predetermined theory about the age of these structures.

Liritzis responded in a journal article published in 2011, stating that Lefkowitz failed to understand and misinterpreted the methodology.

Spain 
The Pyramids of Güímar refer to six rectangular pyramid-shaped, terraced structures, built from lava stone without the use of mortar. They are located in the district of Chacona, part of the town of Güímar on the island of Tenerife in the Canary Islands. The structures have been dated to the 19th century and their original function explained as a byproduct of contemporary agricultural techniques.

Autochthonous Guanche traditions as well as surviving images indicate that similar structures (also known as, "Morras", "Majanos", "Molleros", or "Paredones") could once have been found in many locations on the island. However, over time they have been dismantled and used as a cheap building material. In Güímar itself there were nine pyramids, only six of which survive.

Roman Empire 

The 27-metre-high Pyramid of Cestius was built by the end of the 1st century BC and still exists today, close to the Porta San Paolo. Another one, named Meta Romuli, standing in the Ager Vaticanus (today's Borgo), was destroyed at the end of the 15th century.

Medieval Europe 
Pyramids have occasionally been used in Christian architecture of the feudal era, e.g. as the tower of Oviedo's Gothic Cathedral of San Salvador.

Americas

Peru 
Andean cultures had used pyramids in various architectural structures such as the ones in Caral, Túcume and Chavín de Huantar.

Mesoamerica 

A number of Mesoamerican cultures also built pyramid-shaped structures. Mesoamerican pyramids were usually stepped, with temples on top, more similar to the Mesopotamian ziggurat than the Egyptian pyramid.

The largest pyramid by volume is the Great Pyramid of Cholula, in the Mexican state of Puebla. Constructed from the 3rd century BC to the 9th century AD, this pyramid is considered the largest monument ever constructed anywhere in the world, and is still being excavated. The third largest pyramid in the world, the Pyramid of the Sun, at Teotihuacan is also located in Mexico. There is an unusual pyramid with a circular plan at the site of Cuicuilco, now inside Mexico City and mostly covered with lava from an eruption of the Xitle Volcano in the 1st century BC. There are several circular stepped pyramids called Guachimontones in Teuchitlán, Jalisco as well.

Pyramids in Mexico were often used as places of human sacrifice. For the re-consecration of Great Pyramid of Tenochtitlan in 1487, Where, according to Michael Harner, "one source states 20,000, another 72,344, and several give 80,400".

US and Canada 

Many pre-Columbian Native American societies of ancient North America built large pyramidal earth structures known as platform mounds. Among the largest and best-known of these structures is Monks Mound at the site of Cahokia in what became Illinois, completed around 1100 AD, which has a base larger than that of the Great Pyramid at Giza. Many of the mounds underwent repeated episodes of mound construction at periodic intervals, some becoming quite large. They are believed to have played a central role in the mound-building peoples' religious life and documented uses include semi-public chief's house platforms, public temple platforms, mortuary platforms, charnel house platforms, earth lodge/town house platforms, residence platforms, square ground and rotunda platforms, and dance platforms. Cultures who built substructure mounds include the Troyville culture, Coles Creek culture, Plaquemine culture and Mississippian cultures.

Asia 

There are many square flat-topped mound tombs in China. The First Emperor Qin Shi Huang (circa 221 BC, who unified the 7 pre-Imperial Kingdoms) was buried under a large mound outside modern day Xi'an. In the following centuries about a dozen more Han Dynasty royals were also buried under flat-topped pyramidal earthworks.

India 
Numerous giant, granite, temple pyramids were made in South India during the Chola Empire, many of which are still in religious use today. Examples of such pyramid temples include Brihadisvara Temple at Thanjavur, the Brihadisvara Temple at Gangaikonda Cholapuram, and the Airavatesvara Temple at Darasuram. However, the temple pyramid that has the largest area is the Ranganathaswamy Temple in Srirangam, Tamil Nadu. The Thanjavur temple was built by Raja Raja Chola in the 11th century. The Brihadisvara Temple was declared a World Heritage Site by UNESCO in 1987; the Temple of Gangaikondacholapuram and the Airavatesvara Temple at Darasuram were added as extensions to the site in 2004.

Indonesia 

Next to menhir, stone table, and stone statue; Austronesian megalithic culture in Indonesia also featured earth and stone step pyramid structures called punden berundak as discovered in Pangguyangan site near Cisolok and in Cipari near Kuningan. The construction of stone pyramids is based on the native beliefs that mountains and high places are the abode for the spirit of the ancestors.

The step pyramid is the basic design of 8th century Borobudur Buddhist monument in Central Java. However the later temples built in Java were influenced by Indian Hindu architecture, as displayed by the towering spires of Prambanan temple. In the 15th century Java during late Majapahit period saw the revival of Austronesian indigenous elements as displayed by Sukuh temple that somewhat resemble Mesoamerican pyramid, and also stepped pyramids of Mount Penanggungan.

East Asia, Southeast Asia and Tajikistan 

In east Asia, Buddhist stupas had been usually represented as tall Pagodas. However, some pyramidal stupas remain in limited areas. There is a theory that these pyramid were inspired by Borobudur monument through Sumatran and Javanese monks. Also, there is similar Buddhist monument in Vrang, Tajikistan. At least there are at least 9 Buddhist step pyramids in the world, 4 from former Gyeongsang Province of Korea, 3 from Japan, 1 from Indonesia (Borobudur) and 1 from Tajikistan.

Modern examples

Two pyramid-shaped tombs were erected in Maudlin's Cemetery, Ireland, c. 1840; they are believed to belong to the local De Burgh family.
 The Louvre Pyramid in Paris, France, in the court of the Louvre Museum, is a 20.6 metre (about 70 foot) glass structure which acts as an entrance to the museum. It was designed by the American architect I. M. Pei and was completed in 1989. The Pyramide Inversée (Inverted Pyramid) is displayed in the underground Louvre shopping mall.
 The Tama-Re village was an Egyptian-themed set of buildings and monuments established near Eatonton, Georgia by Nuwaubians in 1993 that was mostly demolished after being sold under government forfeiture in 2005.
 The Luxor Hotel in Las Vegas, United States, is a 30-story true pyramid with light beaming from the top.
 The 32-story Pyramid Arena in Memphis, Tennessee (a city named after the ancient Egyptian capital whose name itself was derived from the name of one of its pyramids). Built in 1991, it was the home court for the University of Memphis men's basketball program, and the National Basketball Association's Memphis Grizzlies until 2004.
 The Walter Pyramid, home of the basketball and volleyball teams of the California State University, Long Beach, campus in California, United States, is an 18-story-tall blue true pyramid.
 The 48-story Transamerica Pyramid in San Francisco, California, designed by William Pereira, one of the city's symbols.
 The 105-story Ryugyong Hotel in Pyongyang, Northern Korea.
 A former museum/monument in Tirana, Albania is commonly known as the "Pyramid of Tirana".  It differs from typical pyramids in having a radial rather than square or rectangular shape, and gently sloped sides that make it short in comparison to the size of its base.
 The Slovak Radio Building in Bratislava, Slovakia. This building is shaped like an inverted pyramid. 
 The Summum Pyramid, a 3-story pyramid in Salt Lake City, used for instruction in the Summum philosophy and conducting rites associated with Modern Mummification.
 The Palace of Peace and Reconciliation in Nur-Sultan, Kazakhstan.
 The Pyramids at Osho International Meditation Resort in Pune, India (for meditation purposes).
 The three pyramids of Moody Gardens in Galveston, Texas.
 The Co-Op Bank Pyramid or Stockport Pyramid in Stockport, England is a large pyramid-shaped office block in Stockport in England. (The surrounding part of the valley of the upper Mersey has sometimes been called the "Kings Valley" after the Valley of the Kings in Egypt.)
 The Ames Monument in southeastern Wyoming honoring the brothers who financed the Union Pacific Railroad.
 The Trylon, a triangular pyramid erected for the 1939 World's Fair in Flushing, Queens and demolished after the Fair closed.
 The Ballandean Pyramid, at Ballandean in rural Queensland is a 15-metre folly pyramid made from blocks of local granite.
 The Karlsruhe Pyramid is a pyramid made of red sandstone, located in the centre of the market square of Karlsruhe, Germany. It was erected in the years 1823–1825 over the vault of the city's founder, Margrave Charles III William (1679–1738).
 The GoJa Music Hall in Prague.
 The Muttart Conservatory greenhouses in Edmonton, Alberta.
 Small pyramids similar to those of the Louvre can be found outside the lobby of the Citicorp Building in Long Island City, Queens NY.
 The Pyramids of the City Stars Complex in Cairo, Egypt.
 Pyramid building belonging to The Digital Group (TDG), at Hinjwadi, Pune, India.
 The Steelcase Corporate Development Center near Grand Rapids, Michigan.
 Sunway Pyramid shopping mall in Selangor, Malaysia.
 Hanoi Museum with an overall design of a reversed Pyramid.
 The Ha! Ha! Pyramid by artist Jean-Jules Soucy in La Baie, Quebec is made out of 3 000 give way signs.
 The "Pyramid" culture-entertainment complex and Monument of Kazan siege (Church of Image of Edessa) in Kazan, Russia.
 The "Phorum" of Expocentre business-exhibition complex in Moscow, Russia.
 Few pyramids of the Marco-city shopping-entertainment complex in Vitebsk, Belarus.
 The Time pyramid in Wemding, Germany, a pyramid begun in 1993 and scheduled for completion in the year 3183.
 Triangle, a proposed skyscraper in Paris.
 The Shimizu Mega-City Pyramid, a proposed project for construction of a massive pyramid over Tokyo Bay in Japan.
 The tomb of Quintino Sella, outside the monumental cemetery of Oropa.
 The Donkin Memorial, erected on a Xhosa reserve in 1820 by Cape Governor Sir Rufane Donkin in memory of his late wife Elizabeth, in Port Elizabeth, South Africa. The pyramid is used in many different coats-of-arms associated with Port Elizabeth. Adjacent to the Pyramid is the lighthouse (1863) that houses the Nelson Mandela Bay Tourism office, as well as a 12 x 8 m South African Flag flying from a 65 m high flagpole. It also forms part of the Route 67 Public Art route.
 The unbuilt Museum of Modern Art in Caracas was designed as an upside down pyramid. Playing on a variation of the famous configuration, by inverting the natural geometry Oscar Niemeyer intended a bold composition nevertheless compact in its principle.

Modern pyramid mausoleums 
With the Egyptian Revival movement in the nineteenth and early twentieth century, pyramids were becoming more common in funerary architecture. This style was especially popular with tycoons in the US. Hunt's Tomb in Phoenix, Arizona and Schoenhofen Pyramid Mausoleum in Chicago are some of the notable examples. Even today some people build pyramid tombs for themselves. Nicolas Cage bought a pyramid tomb for himself in a famed New Orleans graveyard.

Gallery

See also
 List of largest monoliths
 Lists of pyramids
 List of pyramid mausoleums in North America
 Mound
 Pyramid power
 Stupa
 Triadic pyramid

References

 
Types of monuments and memorials

sn:Dumba